Vitebsky Central Sport Complex (also known as Vitebsky CSK in short) is a multi-use sports complex in Vitebsk, Belarus. It is currently used mostly for football matches and is the home ground of FC Vitebsk. The stadium holds 8,144 people.

History
The stadium was built in 1937 and was originally known as Dinamo Stadium. In 1950, it was rebuilt after damages sustained during World War II. It 2002, it was chosen to host a final match of the 2001–02 Belarusian Cup.

In 2003, most of the renovation works were completed and the arena was renamed to Vitebsky Central Sport Complex.

International use
The stadium hosted occasional home games of Belarus national under-21 team. In 2005, it hosted Belarus national team's friendly match against Latvia. It also was used by Naftan Novopolotsk as a home venue in UEFA Europa League qualifiers in 2009 and 2012.

References

External links
 Official website

Football venues in Belarus
Buildings and structures in Vitebsk
Sport in Vitebsk
FC Vitebsk